The Law for the Protection of Macedonian National Honour was a statute passed by the government of the Socialist Republic of Macedonia (SR Macedonia) at the end of 1944. The Presidium of Anti-fascist Assembly for the National Liberation of Macedonia (ASNOM) established a special court for the implementation of this law, which came into effect on January 3, 1945. This decision was taken at the second session of this assembly on 28–31 December 1944.

The tribunal was to judge "the collaborators of the occupiers who have put down the Macedonian national name and the Macedonian national honour", as part of an attempt to differentiate an ethnic and political Macedonian identity separate from neighboring Bulgaria and the historical Ottoman Empire Bulgarian community, of which both had been part, though the statute of the court does not mention Bulgaria or Bulgarians. Although some researchers believe that it continued to be in force until 1991, it is much more likely that it was abolished in February 1948.

History

Background 
During the World War II, Bulgaria annexed the Yugoslav province called Vardar Banovina, encompassing most of modern North Macedonia. The Bulgarians were greeted by most of the locals as liberators from Serbian rule, because pro-Bulgarian sentiments among them then prevailed. After Bulgaria sided with the Axis powers, it lost the war and the last Bulgarian troops withdrew from the region in November 1944. At the end of the World War II in Yugoslav Macedonia the Macedonian national feelings were already ripe, although it is not clear to what extend the Macedonian Slavs considered themselves to be different from the Bulgarians. To wipe out the remaining Bulgarophile sentiments, the new Communist authorities took heavy measures. The task was also to break up all the organisations that opposed the idea of Yugoslavia.

Purpose 
The purpose of the law was to distinguish the new Macedonian nation from Bulgaria, as differentiation from Bulgarians was seen as a confirmation that Macedonians were a separate ethnic community. In Yugoslav Macedonia it was forbidden for the locals to proclaim Bulgarian identity, and also the use of standard Bulgarian language was prohibited. Per Dejan Djokić to proclaim Bulgarian identity was allowed only after 1944 in the Strumica region. The area is part of the so-called Western Outlands, that were part of Bulgaria till 1919. Though per Georgy Fotev only migrants from the Serbian part of the Western Outlands were allowed to declare themselves to be Bulgarians. In the period between 1945 and 1991, when North Macedonia was part of Yugoslavia, there was migration of Bulgarian population from SR Serbia to the SR Macedonia, which numbered per unofficial estimate at 20,000.

Implementation and function
On January 3, 1945, the newspaper Nova Makedonija published the newly adopted Law on the Trial of Crimes against Macedonian National Honour. The law provided for a number of sanctions: deprivation of civil rights, imprisonment with forced labour, confiscation of property, and in cases where it was deemed that the accused might be sentenced to death, it was envisaged that they would be handed over to a "competent court". The law also applies to territories that have been occupied by Italy and Albania. The law is a precedent in European legal history, as such legislation was not adopted in the People's Republic of Slovenia, which was subjected to forced Italianization and Germanization during the war. The Macedonian Serbs were not tried on it either, despite some of them were cooperating with the Axis Forces.

Impact
The act allowed the sentencing of Yugoslav citizens from SR Macedonia for collaboration with the occupational authorities during WWII, for pro-Bulgarian leanings and for agitating against Macedonia's position in Yugoslavia. Bulgarian sources claim that in early 1945, around 100,000 Bulgarophiles were imprisoned and over 1,260 were allegedly killed due to the Law. Some victims tried due to their Bulgarophile leanings were Spiro Kitinchev, Dimitar Gyuzelov and Dimitar Chkatrov. The first president of the Anti-Fascist Assembly of the National Liberation of Macedonia, Metodija Andonov-Čento, was tried due to agitating against Macedonia's position in Yugoslavia. These were highly publicized show-trials, rather than being committed to justice. While occasional trials continued throughout the period the law was in force, the bulk of them took place in the late 1940s.
The law influenced new generations to grow up with strong anti-Bulgarian sentiments, which increased to the level of state policy.

Modern period
Due to the inconsistent and confusing legal regulation of that law, it is not very clear until when it was in force. Although some researchers believe that it continued to be in force until 1991, when the present North Macedonia gained independence from the former Yugoslavia, according to a legal analysis of Macedonian non-governmental activists, it is much more likely that it was abolished in February 1948. This people that stuck to their Bulgarian identity met great hostility among the authorities and the rest of the population. With the fall of Communism the hostility decreased, but still remains. In this way over time, a Bulgarian component to the ethnic identity of the Slavic-speaking population in Vardar Macedonia has disappeared.

See also
 Bloody Christmas (1945)
 Macedonian Bulgarians
 Bulgarians in North Macedonia
 Bulgaria–North Macedonia relations
 Law for the Protection of German Blood and German Honour
 Law for Protection of the Nation
 Haralampi Perev

References

Yugoslav Macedonia
Socialist Republic of Macedonia
Macedonian Bulgarians
Anti-Bulgarian sentiment
Political repression in Communist Yugoslavia
Political and cultural purges
Bulgaria–Yugoslavia relations
Ethnic cleansing in Europe
Aftermath of World War II in Yugoslavia
Law enforcement in Yugoslavia